Gerrit Mannoury (17 May 1867 – 30 January 1956) was a Dutch philosopher and mathematician, professor at the University of Amsterdam and communist, known as the central figure in the signific circle, a Dutch counterpart of the Vienna circle.

Biography 
Gerrit Mannoury was born on 17 May 1867 in Wormerveer, and died on 30 January 1956 in Amsterdam. On 8 August 1907 he married Elizabeth Maria Berkelbach van der Sprenkel, with whom he had three daughters and a son, Jan Mannoury. His father Gerrit Mannoury, a sea-captain, had died in China when he was three years old. He attended the Hogere Burgerschool (HBS) in Amsterdam, where he graduated in 1885. The same year he received a Teacher's Degree in Accounting and in Mechanics. In 1902 he also received a Teacher's Degree in Mathematics. Mannoury was a self-educated mathematician. Because he was a teacher he couldn't attend lessons at the University of Amsterdam. He did receive private lessons from Diederik Korteweg. He was awarded a PhD in Mathematics late in life, in 1946, with L.E.J. Brouwer as his promotores.

Mannoury was a committed socialist throughout his life. In 1901 he helped to found the scientific bureau of the Social Democratic Workers' Party (SDAP), of which he was secretary until 1906. In 1909 Mannoury left the SDAP with Orthodox Marxist opposition, and took a seat on the party board of the newly founded Social Democratic Party (SDP). After the Russian October Revolution, the SDP renamed itself in 1918 to the Communist Party of Holland (CPH) (later the Communist Party of the Netherlands).

Mannoury started working in primary education in Amsterdam, Bloemendaal and Helmond. In 1910 he started teaching at the Hoogere Burger School (HBS) at Vlissingen. In 1902 he had been appointed privaatdocent at the University of Amsterdam and in 1917 he was made professor there. In 1932 Mannoury was disbarred from the Communist Party for supporting the exiled Leon Trotsky. Following this event, Mannoury's political activity was mostly centered for the abolition of the death penalty. 

He retired in 1937. He lectured on the philosophy of mathematics, and on mechanics, analytics and descriptive and projective geometry.

Mannoury was, with Diederik Korteweg, one of the most important teachers of Luitzen Egbertus Jan Brouwer at Amsterdam University, Mannoury especially philosophically. The first appearance of the names "formalism" and "intuitionism" in Brouwer's writings, were in a review of Gerrit Mannoury's book Methodologisches und Philosophisches zur Elementar-Mathematik (Methodological and philosophical remarks on elementary mathematics) from 1909. Two other Dutch scientists he inspired were philosopher and logician Evert W. Beth and psychologist Adriaan de Groot.

He died in Amsterdam.

Work 
Mannoury's main inspirations were G. W. F. Hegel, G.J.P.J. Bolland and F. H. Bradley. He was also inspired by the work of Friedrich Nietzsche, Baruch Spinoza, the French mathematician philosopher of science Henri Poincaré and the English positivism of Bertrand Russell. Mannoury combined a logical-mathematical way of thinking with a deep insight into the human soul.

Publications 
Mannoury was a prolific and polymathic writer who published books, articles, reviews, and pamphlets. 
 1903. Over de beteekenis der wiskundige logica voor de philosophie 
 1907. Het Boeddhisme: Overzicht van leer en geschiedenis 
 1909. Methodologisches und Philosophisches zur Elementar-Mathematik 
 1910. Methodologiese aantekeningen over het dubbel-boekhouden 
 1917. Over de betekenis van de wiskundige denkvorm, Inaugural lecture held at the University of Amsterdam, 8 Oct 1917. 
 1919. Wiskunst, filosofie en socialisme: overdrukken 
 1925. Mathesis en mystiek: Een signifiese studie van kommunisties standpunt 
 1927. Willen en weten: overdrukken 
 1930. Heden is het keerpunt: een onuitgesproken verdedigingsrede 
 1931. Woord en gedachte: een inleiding tot de signifika, inzonderheid met het oog op het onderwĳs in de wiskunde 
 1938. Zur Enzyklopädie der Einheitswissenschaft. Vorträge, with Otto Neurath, E. Brunswik, C. Hull, and J. Woodger.
 1946. Relativisme en dialektiek: schema ener filosofisch-sociologische grondslagenleer 
 1947. Les fondements psycho-linguistiques des mathématiques  
 1947. Handboek der analytische significa, deel I: Geschiedenis der begripskritiek 
 1948. Handboek der analytische significa, deel II: Hoofdbegrippen en methoden der significa: Ontogenese en fylogenese van het verstandshoudingsapparaat 
 1948. De dood als zegepraal : opstellen over de massa-edukatieve zĳde van het doodstrafprobleem
 1949. Signifika: een inleiding 
 1953, Polairpsychologische begripssynthese

References

Further reading 
 Luc Bergmans (2005). "Gerrit Mannoury and his Fellow Significians on Mathematics and Mysticism". In: Mathematics and the Divine : A Historical study. T. Koetsier and L. Bergmans (ed.). Inc NetLibrary.
 D. van Dantzig (1957). "Gerrit Mannoury's significance for mathematics and its foundation" In: Nieuw Archief voor Wiskunde.
 Jan H. Stegeman (1992). Gerrit Mannoury: A Bibliography. Tilburg University Press. 
 Schmitz, H.W. (1987). "Mannoury and Brouwer : Aspects of Their Relationship and Cooperation in In Memory of Gerrit Mannoury II.". In: Methodology and Science. 1987, vol. 20, no1, pp. 40–62 (2 p. 1/2).  
 Pieter Wisse Mannoury's significs, or a philosophy of communal individualism''

External links 
 

1867 births
1956 deaths
20th-century Dutch mathematicians
20th-century Dutch philosophers
Dutch communists
Philosophers of mathematics
People from Zaanstad
University of Amsterdam alumni
Academic staff of the University of Amsterdam